Elswick is a district and electoral ward of the city and metropolitan borough of Newcastle upon Tyne, England, 1.9 miles west of the city centre, bordering the River Tyne. Historically in Northumberland, Elswick became part of Newcastle upon Tyne in 1835. Elswick is home to the Newcastle Utilita Arena; and Newcastle College, with approximately 45,000 students.

History

In Roman times the Vallum, a defensive barrier behind Hadrian's Wall, reached its easternmost limit in Elswick. The Wall itself carried on as far as Wallsend.

The township of Elswick had originally formed part of the Barony of Bolam and was owned by Tynemouth Priory from 1120-1539, with a fishery present on the site. One of the earliest references to the coal mining industry of the north east occurs in 1330, when it was recorded that the Prior of Tynemouth let a colliery, called Heygrove, at "Elstewyke" for a rent of £5 per year. Elswick Colliery had 3 pits working from 1860 onwards.  Elswick was owned by the Crown from 1539 to 1628, until it was sold by Charles I.

The Priors held a mansion in the middle of Elswick which was later occupied by Elswick Hall. Having been rebuilt a number of times, the last rebuild took place in 1810. The grounds of Elswick Hall became Elswick Park in 1881.  Elswick changed significantly in the late 19th century with the extension of the railway from Carlisle to Newcastle in 1839 and the establishment of Armstrong's manufacturing works in 1847. Population increased rapidly during this period, from about 300 in 1801 to 59,165 in 1901. Tyneside flats were built in the area around Scotswood Road to accommodate the workforce.

The Elswick works was founded in 1847 by engineer William George Armstrong. It manufactured hydraulic machinery, cranes and bridges and, later, artillery. In 1882 the company merged with the shipbuilding firm of Charles Mitchell to form Armstrong, Mitchell & Company. Armstrong Mitchell merged again with the engineering firm of Joseph Whitworth in 1897, forming Armstrong, Whitworth & Co.

Elswick railway station was opened in 1889 to serve the area.  It was located at the western end of the Elswick Works, whose workforce made up a significant proportion of travellers.  The area suffered as a result of the inter-war and subsequent depressions, culminating in the demolition of the Elswick works. The station was closed and then demolished in 1967.

Elswick was hit hard by the decline of Tyneside's shipbuilding industry during the second half of the 20th century, and by the 1990s was widely regarded as one of the worst parts of Tyneside, if not the whole of Britain. According to a report by The Independent newspaper, unemployment stood at nearly 30% and the area had a widespread problem with drug abuse and arson attacks.

Elswick today
Present day Elswick consists of a number of distinct neighbourhoods including the Adelaide Terrace area, Bentinck Estate, Condercum and Denhill Park, Cruddas Park (part renamed Riverside Dene), Elswick Triangle, Gill Street and the Courts, Grainger Park, Jubilee Estate, North Benwell, and both from the St John's and St Paul's areas. The local authority ward also incorporates Newcastle College, and the Utilita Arena Newcastle. As of the 2011 census, Elswick had one of the lowest White populations in Newcastle at around 55% with a large Asian population of 33.4% (including 15.9% Bangladeshi, 8.3% Pakistani), and 5.6% Black or Black British. Elswick has a large Muslim population of 31.9% and a Christian population of 43.4%. In 2018 it had an estimated population of 15,869. 

The ward profile shows Elswick is the ward with the highest percentage of children under 14 years in Newcastle and has a lower than average number of senior citizens (10%) than Newcastle as a whole. Elswick has a lower than average number of houses in owner-occupation (26.3% compared with 49.9% for Newcastle city).

Elswick's Location
Located on a height of 53.1m, Elswick overlooks the River Tyne and is a suburban area in the West End of Newcastle upon Tyne.

References

ONS 2011 Census Elswick

External links

 Newcastle Council Ward webpage: Elswick
Ward boundary map: Elswick
 Know Newcastle ward profile for Elswick
 Elswick Local Performance Framework
 Kay's Geography Cruddas Park (Riverside Dene), Elswick

Districts of Newcastle upon Tyne
Wards of Newcastle upon Tyne